Chanasma is a small town and a municipality in Chanasma Taluka of Patan district in the state of Gujarat, India.

Etymology 
There is a legend regarding origin of the name of town. There was a mosque on the bank of the tank in the town which had twelve windows to look at moon (Chand), each for twelve months (Masa) in the calendar. So the town came to be known as Chand-masa which evolved into Chanasma. The mosque or its ruins no longer exists. 

In Chanasma Village Generally living All Casts People but Majority Of Patel (Patidar) Casts people, and Patel Casts From Only one Family's Tree Name Of Shree Lalji das Laxmi das Patel. Like Bhanani, Surani, Hiarani, Samani, Rupani, Bholidas, Ladhani, Etc...

Geography
It has an average elevation of 61 metres (200 feet).

Demographics
At the 2001 India census, Chanasma had a population of 15,819. Males constituted 52% of the population and females 48%. Chanasma had an average literacy rate of 74%, higher than the national average of 59.5%; with male literacy of 81% and female literacy of 67%. 10% of the population was under 6 years of age.

Places of interest
The temple is built with stone and has profusely carved images and figures including that of 24 Tirthankaras. The image of chief deity is made of sand and cow-dung. The floor is covered with marble.

There are temples of Ramji Mandir, Pimpaleshwar Mahadev, Nilkanth Mahadev and Verai Mata. A dargah of Navagaja Pir is located near the town.

Education
Om Public School , Chanasma 
Kids, Std 1 to 12 Science , commerce and arts School . Full Day care school with International Campus

Chanasma also has a commerce and arts college and five schools which provides education until 12th grade.

Amenities
The town has a post office, banks, market yards as well as manufacturing and industrial units. It also has a Chanasma Nagrik Co-operative Bank. It also have hospitals, a veterinary hospital and an artificial insemination centre.

Vadavali

Cities and towns in Patan district